Düyərli (also, Dugyarli, Dugyarly, Dyugyarli, and Dyukyarli) is a village and municipality in the Shamkir Rayon of Azerbaijan.  It has a population of 7,496.

References 

Populated places in Shamkir District